The Rare Book & Manuscript Library is principal repository for special collections of Columbia University. Located in New York City on the university's Morningside Heights campus, its collections span more than 4,000 years, from early Mesopotamia to the present day, and span a variety of formats:  cuneiform tablets, papyri, and ostraca, medieval and Renaissance manuscripts, early printed books, works of art, posters, photographs, realia (such as mathematical instruments and theater models), sound and moving image recordings, and born-digital archives. Areas of collecting emphasis include American history, Russian and East European émigré history and culture, Columbia University history, comics and cartoons, philanthropy and social reform, the history of mathematics, human rights advocacy, Hebraica and Judaica, Latino arts and activism, literature and publishing, medieval and Renaissance manuscripts, oral history, performing arts, and printing history and the book arts.

History

1754–1899
Columbia University was founded by royal charter as King's College in 1754. A group of over one hundred titles from the original King's College Library survived the American Revolution, and are now part of the historic Columbiana Collection. The college exhibited an interest in acquiring significant books early in its history during the presidency of William A. Duer (in office 1829–1842) when it subscribed to the elephant folio edition of John James Audubon's The Birds of America, published from 1827 to 1838. Columbia was one of only three American educational institutions to have acquired this now famous work as it was released. The 1881 bequest of Stephen Whitney Phoenix, the well-travelled scion of a New York merchant family, noted genealogist, and college alumnus, brought Columbia its first collector's library, around seven thousand rare editions and manuscripts. Particular highlights of the Phoenix gift include a 15th-century French Book of Hours, a Jean Grolier bound Aldine edition of philosopher Iamblichus’ works, Shakespeare’s First Folio, and original drawings by inventor Robert Fulton. Professor of Semitic Languages Richard J.H. Gottheil arranged the gift by Temple Emanu-el of New York City of its distinguished library of 2,500 printed books and fifty manuscripts of Hebraica in 1892, which placed Columbia's Judaica collection among the top in the country. Four years after the Temple Emanu-El gift, in 1896, Columbia President Seth Low (in office 1890–1901), decided to make the college a university and to further expand the library so that it could support graduate level research.

1900–1929
Around the turn of the century, a bibliographer was hired to buy out-of-print books, curate exhibitions, and teach. This was an early step in thinking about the special collections in the library which would lead in 1930 to the creation of the Rare Book & Manuscript Library. The beginning of the active acquisition of collections of original manuscripts, autograph letters and documents was marked by Trustee William Schermerhorn's gift in 1902 of New York Governor De Witt Clinton’s papers. Professor of Dramatic Literature Brander Matthews began to transfer his collection to Columbia  in 1912, which later would grow and gain international renown as the Dramatic Museum collection. Two years later, the descendents of the college's first president, Samuel Johnson (in office 1754–1763), and of his son, the college's the third president, William Samuel Johnson (in office 1787–1800), presented the two men's libraries as gifts to the university, supplementing the Columbiana Collection.

The next large collection given to the library was the Jeanne d’Arc collection. Assembled by alumnus and historian of religion Acton Griscom and donated by him in 1920, it consists of several thousand books and manuscripts concerned with the heroine of French history. From 1924 to 1928 Columbia's first Accounting Professor, Robert H. Montgomery, presented his collection on the history of accountancy. Among its manuscript holdings are a ledger-daybook kept by Josiah Winslow in the Plymouth Colony from 1696 to 1759, and the account book of the English sculptor John Flaxman from 1809 to 1826.  

In 1928 book collector, mathematician and Teacher's College Professor David Eugene Smith, along with his friend, publisher George Arthur Plimpton, founded the Friends of the Libraries, the second such organization in the United States (the first was founded at Harvard in 1925) and one that would help to drive the growth of Columbia's special collections for decades to come. The first major effort of the university to acquire a collection of rare research material by purchase occurred a year later, when the university bought the internationally known library on the history of economics assembled by Professor Edwin R. A. Seligman. The purchase of the Seligman library marked the beginning of the spectacular growth of the library during the 1930s.

1930–1945
On July 1, 1930, the Rare Book Department was established with trustee approval, and Hellmut Lehmann-Haupt became its director from 1930 until 1939. Just before the official formation of the department, textile industry magnate and ardent opponent of the metric system, Samuel S. Dale donated his library on weights and measures, which was accepted by trustees on June 3, 1930. Professor David Eugene Smith began to donate his collection on the history of mathematics, which included a diverse range of material acquired on trips to Europe, the Middle East, South Asia, and the Far East, in 1931. In turn, Smith's generosity encouraged George Plimpton to donate his library. The Plimpton library, which had been in part placed on deposit in 1932, was formally presented in 1936, and contained more than sixteen thousand volumes on the history of education. The three hundred and seventeen medieval and renaissance manuscripts from these collections form the largest such group in the library. Among his donations included the first printed edition of Euclid's Elements of Geometry from 1482; the only known copy of the Treviso Arithmetic, a Venetian math textbook; an annotated copy of the works of Homer owned by Philip Melanchthon and inscribed by Martin Luther; and a copy of Herodotus' Histories owned by Desiderius Erasmus. 

In 1933, Salo Baron, the first professor of Jewish History at Columbia, arranged for the purchase of approximately 700 Judaica manuscripts for the collection. In 1941, the seed of the graphic arts collection was planted when Henry Lewis Bullen, the Australian-born founder of the American Type Founders Company, sold Columbia that institution's library after the company went bankrupt. It included one of only three American copies of Peter Schoeffer’s landmark Canon missae (1458). At the time, Bullen claimed that the American Type Founders Company collection was “by far the most complete and effective collection in existence relating to the arts of the book.” The following year Professor of Latin and Greek at Teachers College, Gonzalez Lodge, gifted his collection of works by classical authors, which included more than one hundred incunabula. 

By 1942, the foundation of Columbia's rare book collections had been laid. As early as 1940, the department was operating under the name “Special Collections,” and had two separate reading rooms, one for manuscripts and the other for rare books. In 1946, the name of the division was officially changed from the Rare Book Department to the Department of Special Collections when Roland O. Baughman (in office 1946–1967) was appointed its head, succeeding Charles Adams (in office 1939–1945).

1945–1990
In the years following World War II, the understanding of what constituted a “special collection” began to expand as the  library began to document twentieth century history at a global scale. The Oral History Archives at Columbia was founded by historian and journalist Allan Nevins in 1948 (as the Oral History Research Office) and is credited with launching the establishment of oral history archives internationally. The Oral History Archives at Columbia is the archival branch of the Columbia Center for Oral History, with the education and research arm, the Columbia Center for Oral History Research based in the Interdisciplinary Center for Innovative Theory & Empirics. At over 12,000 interviews, the Oral History Archives at Columbia is one of the largest oral history collections in the United States. It is unique in the nation in that it has never been confined in its scope to one region or area of historical experience. Early interviews focused on distinguished leaders in politics and government, the “Great Men” of history. Over time, the biographical collection grew to include interviews with notable figures in philanthropy, business, radio, publishing, filmmaking, medicine, science, public health, law, military, architecture, and the arts.

In the 1950s and 1960s, the oral history office conducted and acquired a number of large-scale projects including Radio Pioneers, 1950–1974; Chinese Republican Oral History, 1958–1976; Popular Arts, 1958–1960; Occupation of Japan, 1960–1961; Eisenhower Administration, 1962–1972; Psychoanalytic Movement, 1963–1982; and Nobel Laureates on Scientific Research, 1964. Beginning in the 1980s, the oral history office expanded its collecting approach to include histories of the New Left, civil rights, and peace movements, as well as community history. Today, the Oral History Archives at Columbia takes a more inclusive approach to collecting as a reparative correction to past biases. Recent thematic priorities include space, broadly defined, to include displacement, development, gentrification, uses of space,  digital culture, the art world and archives and a continuing focus on grassroots movement including responses to gun violence, mass incarceration, anti-Islamophobia and resisting anti-trans violence. The Oral History Archives at Columbia continues to work under the umbrella of the Columbia Center for Oral History with colleagues in the research arm on large-scale projects, including the September 11, 2001 Oral History Project, the Obama Presidency Oral History Project and the NYC COVID-19 Oral History, Narrative and Memory Archive. 

Born in Tbilisi in 1880, Boris Alexandrovich Bakhmeteff was a civil engineer and diplomat who, after serving in a number Russian government posts during the Russian Revolution, emigrated to the United States and became a professor of civil engineering at Columbia. In 1951, he helped to establish an archive dedicated to Russian history and culture at the university. The newly founded archive received financial support from the Rockefeller Foundation and from a foundation that Bakhmeteff himself had founded in 1936 called the Humanities Fund. In 1973 the archive was renamed the Bakhmeteff Archive of Russian and East European History and Culture, and the Humanities Fund transferred to Columbia, where it supported both a professorship in Russian Studies and a full-time curator for the archive.  By 1986 it had grown to become the second largest depository in the world (after the Hoover Institution) of Russian émigré holdings. Ranging widely in subject matter from art history and literature to organizational history and politics, the approximately 1,500 collections of the Bakhmeteff Archive allow scholars from the former socialist block to discover aspects of pre-Soviet and émigré life that had not been known at all in their home countries. A printed catalog of the holdings, Russia in the Twentieth Century: The Catalog of the Bakhmeteff Archive of Russian and East European History and Culture, Rare Book and Manuscript Library, Columbia University, was published in June 1987 by G.K. Hall.

As the library's collecting scope began to encompass non-Western peoples and subjects in the 1950s, it also slowly expanded to include women and racial and ethnic minorities. Particularly notable in this regard was former Columbia University waiter, bellhop, and proprietor of popular bookstore during the Harlem Renaissance, Alexander Gumby, who sold the university  his collection of more than one hundred and seventy scrapbooks with photographs, pamphlets, and ephemera, documenting an array of topics related to African American and diasporic history.  And, in 1955, Frances Perkins, Secretary of Labor under President Franklin Roosevelt, the first woman to serve in a cabinet position, and Columbia alumna, donated her papers to the university. 

The following year, the library acquired the papers of John Jay, former New York governor, U.S. Secretary of State and Foreign Affairs, and the first chief justice of the U.S. Supreme Court (1789–1795). Following in quick succession were manuscript collections relating to other American founders, including Gouvernor Morris and Alexander Hamilton. A similar pattern played out when, in 1963, Chinese statesman and alumnus Wellington Koo donated his papers on politics and international affairs, and several notable Chinese military and political figures followed suit, including Li Han Hun, Shihui Xiong, and Peter Chang. In 1971, Edith Louise Altschul Lehman established the Lehman collections at Columbia, including the papers of her late husband, another former governor of New York, Herbert H. Lehman, as well as those of Governor Charles Poletti and records relating to the United Nations Relief and Rehabilitation Administration. To honor Governor Lehman's legacy and highlight artifacts from  these collections, Ms. Lehman also made possible the construction of the Lehman Suite in Columbia's School of International Affairs building. The Lehman endowment provides for the ongoing maintenance of the Lehman Suite (including a 2020 renovation) and for a full-time curator dedicated to the library's American History collections.

The period between 1950 and 1970 also saw the acquisition of manuscript collections relating to major American literary figures, including Hart Crane, Stephen Crane, and Tennessee Williams, as well as contemporary writers such as Pulitzer Prize-winning novelist Herman Wouk and Allen Ginsberg, the influential Beat poet. In 1970 the gift of the Random House archive inaugurated a sustained effort to collect papers from editors, publishers, and literary agents—an area which would quickly become a singular strength for Columbia with the addition of papers relating to Richard L. Simon, Lincoln Schuster, and Bennett Cerf,  as well as the records of Harper & Brothers, Harper & Row, W. W. Norton, and Curtis Brown. Further amplifying the library's literary holdings was Solton Engel, an attorney and alumnus who donated more than five hundred rare items, including Shakespeare's third (1663) and fourth (1685) folios. The Jack Harris Samuels Library, which included three thousand rare editions of American and English literature, was bequeathed by the collector's mother, Mollie Harris Samuels, in 1970, and was formally transferred to the university in 1974. 

Much of this expansive growth occurred under the leadership of director Kenneth A. Lohf, who, between 1967 and 1993, saw the rare book collection increase in size by 275,000 volumes and the addition of 21 million manuscripts. It was also during his tenure that the division adopted its current name of Rare Book & Manuscript Library (1975). A highly effective fund-raiser, Lohf secured $3 million in gifts to support capital improvements and, in 1984 the new Rare Book and Manuscript Library opened in a redesigned and renovated space on the sixth floor of Butler Library, including two public reading rooms and extensive exhibition space.

1991–Present
In the 1990s and 2000s the Rare Book & Manuscript Library began to expand its collections relating to African American history and culture, placing a particular focus on Harlem. Some of the notable acquisitions include the papers of political activist Hubert H. Harrison, historian and journalist C.L.R. James, poet Amiri Baraka, Dance Theater of Harlem founder Arthur Mitchell, and former New York City Mayor David Dinkins. Since 2012 the library has also been collecting archives relating to Latino Arts and Activism with special attention to the New York City/Caribbean diaspora. Notable collections include the papers of writers Dolores Prida, Jack  Agüeros, and Rosario Ferré, and artists Jack and Irene Delano as well as the records of community organizations like United Bronx Parents. Another recent collection priority has focused on Asian American history, with the additions of the papers of William Yukon Chang, editor of the Chinese-American Times, and Yuri Kochiyama, a close ally of Malcolm X, whose life was dedicated to activism on behalf of civil rights, Asian American rights, and other social movements.

The Carnegie Collections consist of four philanthropic organizations founded by industrialist Andrew Carnegie. The Carnegie Corporation of New York, founded in 1911, began to transfer its records to Columbia in 1990 and continues to send yearly additions. The Carnegie Endowment for International Peace, founded in 1910, became part of CUL in 1953, with additions in 1961–1962. The Carnegie Foundation for the Advancement of Teaching, founded in 1905, became part of CUL in 1990. The Carnegie Council for Ethics in International Affairs, founded as The Church Peace Union in 1914, came to CUL in 1974 with additions over many years. The Carnegie Corporation also provides support for a full-time archivist to process and provide reference support for these collections.

As early as 1959, Columbia University historian Richard B. Morris led an effort to publish a four volume set of all previously unpublished writings by John Jay. Though centered on the Rare Book & Manuscript Library's collection, the effort also drew on relevant materials held by other repositories. 1975 and 1980 saw the release of the first two volumes, but three and four never made it to press. In 1997, with the appointment of a new editorial advisory board, the library decided to digitize the source material gathered by the Morris team, and to commence a new print series comprising seven volumes. With support from various funding agencies, most notably the National Historical Records and Publications Commission, the seven volumes were published by 2021. The Selected Papers of John Jay is published by the University of Virginia Press in both print and electronic form. 

In 2004, building upon work that began at the University of Colorado at Boulder, Columbia University Libraries established the Center for Human Rights Documentation & Research (CHRDR), a programmatic initiative to develop collections to support research, learning, and advocacy in the multi-disciplinary field of human rights. Archives related to human rights advocacy and activism form a central focus of the collecting program and the center, in partnership with the Rare Book & Manuscript Library, supports the management of and access to these collections. Major collections include the records of Human Rights Watch, Amnesty International USA, the Physicians for Human Rights, and Human Rights First, and other non-governmental organizations. The papers of individuals who have made contributions to human rights advocacy and the records of Columbia's teaching and research programs complement the core organizational record collections. To extend our collecting to encompass digital sources of information, CUL created the Human Rights Web Archive (HRWA) in 2008.  The web archive is an initiative to systematically capture and preserve human rights websites to enable ongoing access to information that may be ephemeral and at-risk of disappearing. In addition to capturing the web-based information generated by organizations whose print records the center holds, the web archive includes hundreds of other organizational and individual websites. 

The origins of University Archives can be traced to the Columbiana collection, a vast store of Columbia memorabilia including documents, records, artifacts, photographs, and books that was created in the late 19th century and endowed as a department in 1930. The University Archives, established in 1991 under the auspices of the Office of the Secretary, continues the work of the Columbiana Library and its curators by collecting, preserving, and providing access to records of enduring historical, legal, fiscal, and/or administrative value to Columbia University from the 18th century to the present. Areas of documentation include contributions to teaching and research, the development of schools, academic departments, institutes, and administrative units, the development of the physical plant, campus and student life, public service, and the university's role in the history of the metropolitan, national, and international communities. Prominent University Archives collections include the Office of the President Central Files, the Office of the Provost Records, the Historical Photograph Collection, and the University Protest and Activism Collection. Although information about Architecture, Columbia's Law School, Health Sciences campus, Earth Institute, Lamont–Doherty Earth Observatory, Nevis Laboratories, Barnard College, Teachers College, and Union Theological Seminary may be found among its holdings, the University Archives does not actively collect records from these divisions and affiliates. 

In July 2006 the unit was administratively transferred to the libraries under the auspices of the Rare Book & Manuscript Library and, in the autumn of 2007, the University Archives physically relocated its operations and collections from its original home in Low Library to Butler Library's sixth floor. A formal records management program commenced in 2015 and now the Archives functions not only as a repository for the history of the university but provides guidance on the maintenance and disposition of records  for all units reporting to the Office of the Provost.
In 2011, building on related materials in the history of book illustration, such as the Arthur Rackham collection, and existing cartoon collections such as the papers of Charles Saxon, drawings by Max Beerbohm, and the cartoons found in the Pulitzer Prize records, Columbia University Libraries formally initiated a new collecting area in comics and cartoons, focusing on New York-area creators and materials dealing with publishing history.  The papers of long-time X-Men writer Chris Claremont served as a springboard for the papers of Elfquest creators Wendy and Richard Pini, Mad artist Al Jaffee, underground comix artist Howard Cruse, and many others, leading as well to the creation of a newly designated curatorial area in the Rare Book & Manuscript Library in 2017.

The Rare Book & Manuscript Library has taken shape over nearly 270 years of Columbia University history. Its collections have grown to  a half million rare books and nearly a hundred thousand linear feet of archives. They span centuries, subjects, languages, and geographies. In spite of this heterogeneity, the library aims to collect deeply in specific areas, guided by both resources and historical precedence. Teaching and outreach to Columbia's faculty and students are priorities, even while the Rare Book & Manuscript Library's audience is global. (Some three-quarters of the library's visitors do not have a Columbia affiliation.) The library's staff go about the work of collecting, describing, preserving, and providing access to the university's special collections with perspicuity and self-awareness of its role within Columbia University, Harlem, New York City, and the larger world of academic research institutions.

Units
The Rare Book & Manuscript Library is currently organized into five units:

Administration
Archives Processing (oversees the arrangement and description of manuscripts and archives)
Collections Management (responsible for the intake and ongoing care of all collections regardless of format)
Curatorial (devoted to collection development, instruction, and outreach relating to core areas including Medieval & Renaissance collections, Russian & Eastern European émigrés (the Bakhmeteff Archive), American History, Literature, Rare Books, oral history (Oral History Archives at Columbia), the performing arts, and comics and cartoons.
Public Services (manages the reading room, online and in-person reference and duplication requests)
University Archives (charged with preserving and providing access to Columbia University's history)

References

 Jewels in Her Crown
 Rare Book & Manuscript Library: Collections and Treasures
  Columbia University. Rare Book and Manuscript Library, A guide to the manuscript collections in the Rare Book and Manuscript Library of Columbia University, Boston, Massachusetts : G.K. Hall & Co., 1992
Ashton, Jean. “An Introduction by Jean Ashton, Director of RBML.” In Jewels in Her Crown: Treasures from the Special Collections of Columbia's Libraries. USA: Columbia University in the City of New York, 2004.
Jacob Bailey Moore, Henry Thayer Drowne, Memorial Sketches of Stephen Whitney Phoenix. Boston:  Press of David Clapp & Son, 1883.
“Columbia Gets Printing Books Type Founders Exhibit Is Now on Deposit At the Library,” Columbia Daily Spectator, Volume LX, Number 8, 5 October 1936
Columbia University Archives website timelines.
“Columbia is given $1.4 million fund.” The New York Times. November 18, 1973.
Hyde, Mary C. “History of the Library friends and the Phoenix Story of Columbia.” In Library Columns. Volume XX. No. 3. 1971.
Lohf, Kenneth A. “Collections of the Rare Book and Manuscript Library.” In The Rare Book and Manuscript Library of Columbia University: Collections and Treasures, 11–32. New York: Columbia University Libraries, 1985.
Douglas Martin, Obituary for Kenneth A. Lohf in The New York Times. May 18, 2002.
Bruce P. Montgomery, "Archiving human rights: A paradigm for collection development." The Journal of Academic Librarianship 22.2 (1996): 87–96. https://doi.org/10.1016/S0099-1333(96)90174-3
Oral History Interview with Rare Book Librarian Jane Siegel. 2016.
Somerville, Robert. “Some Remarks on the Early History of Columbia University’s Collections of Medieval and Renaissance Manuscripts.” In Rare Book and Manuscript Occasional Publication 1: Medieval and Renaissance Manuscripts at Columbia University, edited by Beatrice Terrien-Somerville, page 1, 6. New York City: Columbia University Libraries, 1991.

External links
 Columbia University. Rare Book & Manuscript Library
Columbia University Archives
Oral History Archives at Columbia
Selected Papers of John Jay
Columbia University. Center for Human Rights Documentation & Research
Columbia University Libraries
Columbia University

Columbia University Libraries
Libraries in Manhattan
Literary archives in the United States
Rare book libraries in the United States
Art museums and galleries in Manhattan
Special collections libraries in the United States